William Terence Tufts (born 1954 in Gasline, Ontario) is a Canadian singer-songwriter writing in many different musical genres.

History 

Tufts is a finger-style guitarist living off-grid with his wife (pianist Kathryn Briggs) and daughter in the bush in Ontario.

Tufts has been playing music for enjoyment since 1963 and as a profession since 1974. His father's job with the Canadian government moved the family to Denver, Colorado in the US in the 1960s, at a time when the folk and rock music genres were influencing opinion everywhere. Other postings that influenced him musically took him to Ottawa, Ontario, and Rome, Italy. Upon returning to Canada to complete high school, he began to work as a full-time musician and continues to do so to this day.

In 1974 he moved to Fredericton, New Brunswick, to pursue his own musical career as a singer-songwriter and guitarist for A Joint Effort (Rick Bastedo, Brian Bourne, Grant Harrison, Tim Tufts, and Terry Tufts), and later a reformed version of that band called Redrock Hotel (Dan Artuso, Brian Bourne, Mario Melanson, Tim Tufts, and Terry Tufts.) The Effort released an LP, Final Effort, upon the groups disbanding, and one 45 rpm recording with RedRock Hotel (Hitchhiker's Dream – T. Tufts b/w Your Constant Change – B. Bourne) was released in the late 70s.

Tufts has worked as a session musician and sideman for a variety of artists including Tom Paxton, Kathryn Briggs, David Francey, Colleen Peterson, Laura Smith, Laura Bird, Ian Tamblyn, Bill Garrett & Sue Lothrop, Charlie Sohmer, The Arrogant Worms, Wayne Rostad, Susan Aglukark, Tracey Brown, and George Fox.

In 2014, with Kathryn Briggs, he formed the duo K.E.W.T.(initials for Kathryn Elizabeth & William Terence).  They were joined by double bassist John Geggie.  Two albums were released over the next two years.

In 2016, under suggestion by luthier Linda Manzer, the trio formed The Algonquin Ensemble (with Lisa Moody – viola, Laura Nerenberg – violin, and Margaret Tobolowska – cello) to musically interpret the canvases and life story of Canadian Group of Seven motivator Tom Thomson. Their piece, Sonic Palette: Tom Thomson's Voice Through Music 100 Years Later, premiered at the McMichael Canadian Art Collection 9 July 2017 to a sold out audience.

Tufts has recorded six albums, one of which remains unreleased.  Three of these albums are on Borealis Records.

Arctic Rose is the opening cut from Susan Aglukark’s 1982 debut album, first titled Dreams for You and re-released as Arctic Rose.  The music is written by Terry Tufts as well as the original lyric after being approached by the album's producer, Randall Prescott, who was looking for material for the project.  The lyric deals with a friend or Aglukark's who was sent South from her home to school.  His experience was not a good one and he took his own life.  Randall Prescott briefly told of the incident to Tufts and Tufts changed a song he had already written to accommodate the story.  Later Prescott said Aglukark, referring to her late friend, had told him "he was so beautiful" and Prescott asked Tufts to put the line in the song, Aglukark never being able to be present for the writing.  Aglukark added two lines in Inuktitut at the beginning of the song sung to the guitar riff Tufts constructed.   The original lyric Tufts wrote to his music is below:

Arctic Rose

He came from the Keewatin where half the year was night 

But he never knew what darkness was ‘til he’d seen those city lights 

He never really felt the cold ‘til he walked in white man’s shoes

A stranger in the strangest land, abandoned and abused

They sent him south away from home and buried him in school

A flower pulled out by the roots, a hunter without tools.

CHORUS

It’s not the sharpness of the blade, It’s how much light it throws

It’s more the way the wisdom’s used

Than just how much one knows

Why would you pick the perfect flower

When you could have watched it grow?

A worthless act, a waste of life

When you pluck the Arctic Rose

And then the warm came creeping and the restlessness took hold

Calling back to older ways, the path deep in his soul

And when his hopes had taken flight and his dreams all but let go

He silently let go of life and the spirits brought him home

Dying bloom in fading light, as dark as dark can be

Never to become the flower that he was meant to be

REPEAT CHORUS

W.T. Tufts

SOCAN

Discography

As Part Of K.E.W.T. (with Kathryn Briggs & John Geggie)

 Mother Lode (2014) Blue Northern Music
 Winter Light (2015) Blue Northern Music

Solo
 Terry Tufts (1987) Snowy River Records, then Blue Northern Music
 Transparent Blue (1990) Snowy River Records, then Blue Northern Music
 Down the Eighth and Gone (1995) Blue Northern Music
 Two Nights Solo (1999) Nutshell Music
 Walk On (2001) Borealis Records
 Two Nights Solo (2002) Re-Released by Borealis Records
 Six Strings North of the Border (2003) Borealis Records
 The Better Fight (2005) Borealis Records

Compilation Contributions
 "For Lovin' Me", Beautiful: A Tribute to Gordon Lightfoot (2004)

References

External links
Official Website

1954 births
Canadian folk singer-songwriters
Canadian male singer-songwriters
Living people
People from Port Colborne
Canadian folk guitarists
Canadian male guitarists